The Manukau by-election was a by-election in the New Zealand electorate of Manukau, a seat in the north of the North Island.

Background
The by-election was held on 6 December 1906, and was precipitated by the death of sitting MP Matthew Kirkbride who had held the seat since the  election. The election was won by Frederic Lang who stood as an independent conservative. His sole opponent was George Ballard of the Liberal Party, who contested in the Government's interests.

Result
The following table gives the election results:

References

Manakau, 1906
1906 elections in New Zealand
Politics of the Auckland Region